Protaetia affinis is a species of beetle of the family Scarabaeidae.

Distribution 
It is very common in Southern and Central Europe. It prefers continental climate.

Appearance 
Protaetia affinis is usually 25–30 mm long, with a thick-set body. Both sides of its body are metallic emerald. The elytra have very small punctures, and no horizontal striae. The legs are also green, with white stripes.

Lifestyle 
Adults only occasionally visit flowers. It is more frequently found at trees with juicy fruits.

References

Cetoniinae
Beetles described in 1797